Ananda Mohan Biswas was an Indian politician. He was elected to the Lok Sabha, the lower house of the Parliament of India from the Nabadwip in West Bengal as a member of the Trinamool Congress.

References

External links
Official biographical sketch in Parliament of India website

1939 births
2003 deaths
Trinamool Congress politicians from West Bengal
Lok Sabha members from West Bengal
India MPs 1999–2004
People from Nadia district